Club Atlético Deportivo Paraguayo is an Argentine football club, founded in 1961 by the Paraguayan community living in Buenos Aires. The team currently plays at Primera D, the fourth division of Argentine football league system.

The club's building is often used for cultural acts such as speeches about Paraguayan history and performance of traditional Paraguayan dances. The team does not have an own stadium, so they generally play its home games at the venues of Liniers and Atlas.

Titles
Primera D: 1
1991/92

Players

Current squad

See also
List of football clubs in Argentina
Argentine football league system

External links
 

Association football clubs established in 1961
Football clubs in Buenos Aires
1961 establishments in Argentina